Heck-Hasler House is a historic home located in Clark Township, Johnson County, Indiana. The house was built about 1868, and is a two-story, "T"-plan, Italianate style brick dwelling on a limestone block foundation.  It features a one-story cast iron front porch with decorative colonettes and lattice work.  Also on the property are the contributing smokehouse, summer kitchen, and milk house.

It was listed on the National Register of Historic Places in 2000.

References

Houses on the National Register of Historic Places in Indiana
Italianate architecture in Indiana
Houses completed in 1868
Buildings and structures in Johnson County, Indiana
National Register of Historic Places in Johnson County, Indiana